Cricqueville-en-Auge (literally Cricqueville in Auge) is a commune in the Calvados department in the Normandy region in northwestern France.

Population

See also
Cricqueville-en-Bessin
Communes of the Calvados department

References

Communes of Calvados (department)
Calvados communes articles needing translation from French Wikipedia